New Baden is a village in Clinton County, Illinois, United States (and partially in St. Clair County). The population was 3,428 at the 2020 census.

Geography
New Baden is located at  (38.535479, -89.700136).

History
New Baden is named after the historical territory of Baden, Germany. It was founded in 1855, remaining a small village until struck by a devastating tornado in 1896. Neighboring communities contributed to the rebuilding, creating a larger, more modern town which began to thrive, its success coinciding with the end of the long depression.

Demographics

As of the 2020 census there were 3,428 people, 1,322 households, and 767 families residing in the village. The racial makeup of the village was 85.44% White, 2.65% African American, 0.64% Native American, 0.85% Asian, 0.06% Pacific Islander, 3.59% from other races, and 6.77% from two or more races. Hispanic or Latino of any race were 5.11% of the population.

There were 1,322 households, out of which 38.28% had children under the age of 18 living with them, 41.07% were married couples living together, 10.36% had a female householder with no husband present, and 41.98% were non-families. 27.91% of all households were made up of individuals, and 6.58% had someone living alone who was 65 years of age or older. The average household size was 3.02 and the average family size was 2.35.

The village's age distribution consisted of 19.9% under the age of 18, 5.7% from 18 to 24, 22.3% from 25 to 44, 39.7% from 45 to 64, and 12.4% who were 65 years of age or older. The median age was 47.1 years. For every 100 females, there were 107.1 males. For every 100 females age 18 and over, there were 112.9 males.

The median income for a household in the village was $79,412, and the median income for a family was $93,875. Males had a median income of $60,154 versus $40,308 for females. The per capita income for the village was $43,061. About 2.9% of families and 5.5% of the population were below the poverty line, including 8.5% of those under age 18 and none of those age 65 or over.

Notable people 
 Brent Brede, professional baseball player
 Paul Lusk, professional basketball player
 Bertha Weber, composer

References

Villages in Clinton County, Illinois
Villages in Illinois